Rudisill–Wilson House is a historic home located near Newton, Catawba County, North Carolina. It was built about 1820, and is a two-story, three-bay, central hall plan frame dwelling.  It features exterior end chimneys and a shed porch with late-19th century brackets.

It was listed on the National Register of Historic Places in 1973.

References

Houses on the National Register of Historic Places in North Carolina
Houses completed in 1820
Houses in Catawba County, North Carolina
National Register of Historic Places in Catawba County, North Carolina